Stefano Casagranda (born March 23, 1973, in Borgo Valsugana) is a former Italian racing cyclist. He rode in 11 Grand Tours.

Major results

1996
1st stage 5 Paris–Nice
1997
1st stage 2 Hofbrau Cup (TTT)
1998
1st stage 1 Giro del Trentino
2000
1st stage 4 Vuelta a Castilla y León
2001
1st stage 3 Danmark Rundt
3rd Clásica de Sabiñánigo
2002
1st stage 1 Regio-Tour
3rd Gran Premio Industria e Commercio di Prato
2003
2nd Grand Prix Pino Cerami
3rd Grand Prix d'Ouverture La Marseillaise

References

1973 births
Living people
Italian male cyclists
Sportspeople from Trentino
Cyclists from Trentino-Alto Adige/Südtirol